Bhargava or Bhṛguvamsha refers to a Brahmin race or dynasty that is said to have been founded by the legendary Hindu sage, Bhrigu.

Legend 

In Hinduism, the Bhargavas are the purohitas, the family priests, of the daityas and the danavas. They are regarded to be associated with the Angiras, the Atharvans, and the Ribhus, races named for their founders, who were also great sages. Some of the notable characters in Hinduism who belong to the Bhargava race include:

 Chyavana
 Shukra
 Shaunaka
 Richika
 Jamadagni
 Parashurama
 Valmiki

The rulers of the Haihaya dynasty are first described to be great patrons of Bhargavas such as Richika, to whom the latter served as the chief priest. When his son, Jamadagni, is murdered by the Haihaya king, Kartavirya Arjuna, his son, Parashurama, the incarnation of Vishnu, slays him. When his resurrected father is killed once more by the king's son, he begins a quest to wipe out all the Kshatriya rulers he could find on earth, and bequeaths the colonised land to the Saptarishi.

Lineage 
In later legends, the Bhargavas were associated with the Haihayas, the Anarta of Gujarat, Kanyakubja of Madhyadesa, as well as the rulers of Malabar.

Today, Bhargava also refers to a Brahmin community in India, who claim descent from the sage Bhrigu.

See also
 Suryavamsha
 Yaduvamsha
 Chandravamsha

References

Hindu mythology
Rishis